Shannon Rebecca Saunders (born 4 July 1994), known professionally as iiola is an English singer-songwriter from Wiltshire.

Early life 
Saunders started writing and producing songs at the age of 13. She attended the Royal Wootton Bassett Academy and the Stagecoach Drama School.

She left school at sixteen to study song writing at BIMM in Bristol for a year before heading for London to pursue her career.

Career 
In 2009 Saunders was inspired by Justin Bieber to start a YouTube channel, where she posted covers of songs, as well as her own originals. As of January 2023, she has over 58,300 subscribers and nearly 2 million total upload views.

Shannon Saunders 
In 2010 Saunders sang "I See the Light" for the UK release of Tangled. She was discovered by Disney Channel UK via her YouTube channel and asked to audition after winning the My Camp Rock contest that same year. In 2011 she was invited to sing "The Glow" for a London event celebrating the induction of Rapunzel to the Disney Princess franchise.

Her first single released as Shannon Saunders, "Heart of Blue", was released on her own label, Lovejoy Records. It peaked at #48 on the iTunes charts. The music video, whose production only cost nine pounds, featured Saunders running barefoot through Oxford Street, London filmed by Damian Weilers.

Whilst touring in 2013 Shannon independently released Atlas and created the official music video incorporating her live performances and interactions with her fanbase. 

In 2014 Saunders released two singles: "Sheets" and "Silly Little Things". 

In 2015, she released an EP in partnership with Caroline International titled Instar. After performing stripped back live versions of the EP on SBTV one of her songs "LO-FI", co-written and produced by Dee Adam, was then picked up and sampled by frumhere on his track "she only likes me when i'm drunk".

Following the success of the "Heart of Blue" video, Saunders teamed up again with director Damian Weilers to create a music video for her song "Pure" (produced and co-written by Mark Wilkinson and Dee Adam). The video was shot at Reynisfjara, the black-sand beach found on the south coast of Iceland, and had minimal electronic elements and electric guitar.

"Rips in your Jeans" was released in 2017 and highlights a self-directed and produced video featuring Saunders' fanbase. It was shot by her with the help of Raja Virdi in East London's vintage store 'Atika'.

The last track released under Saunders' birth name, "Still", was created as an awareness track for mental health issues and was supported by Heads Together, a charity under The Royal Foundation umbrella.

iiola 
In 2018 Saunders released her debut four track EP titled Chrysalis under her new artist name iiola. Spotify UK added all three singles from Chrysalis to New Music Fridays. Live stripped back versions of the first two singles are available on YouTube. 

iiola is a firm favorite of BBC Introducing and is currently writing her debut album whilst creating and designing her live show.

Personal life 
Saunders has Romani heritage.

Discography

Extended plays

External links 

 Official YouTube

References

1994 births
Living people
English women singers
Walt Disney Records artists